The 1993 Grand Prix motorcycle racing season was the 45th F.I.M. Road Racing World Championship season.

Season summary
Kevin Schwantz won the 1993 world championship in a season marred by the tragic end to his rival Wayne Rainey's career. Schwantz started the season strongly with four wins by the midpoint of the season. With three races remaining, Rainey had battled back to take the championship points lead while Schwantz nursed a wrist injury. At the Italian Grand Prix, Rainey had just taken the lead and was pulling away when he fell. He suffered serious spinal injuries and would never walk again. Rainey's accident marked the end of an era of American domination in Grand Prix racing.

Newcomers Daryl Beattie and Alex Barros took their first wins (Barros after twice crashing out of the lead) while Mick Doohan struggled to recover from his serious leg injuries. Freddie Spencer made one more comeback attempt but crashed in two of the first three rounds. Honda entered factory test rider Shinichi Itoh on a third bike with development parts, rumored to include electronic fuel injection, as he was noticeably faster in a straight line that the other Honda riders. When Itoh broke the 200 mph barrier at Hockenheim, it gave credence to these rumors. Officially, all three bikes gained the injection system at the same time

A new star emerged on the 250 scene with Tetsuya Harada taking the crown in a tight battle with Loris Capirossi. German privateer, Dirk Raudies won the 125 crown with 9 victories on a Honda.

The 1993 season also marks the last time a rider is allowed to compete in two different classes at the same race.

1993 Grand Prix season calendar
The following Grands Prix were scheduled to take place in 1993:

Calendar changes
 The Australian Grand Prix replaced the Japanese Grand Prix with hosting the opening round.
 The Hungarian, French (which was held at the Magny-Cours circuit) and Brazilian Grand Prix (which was held at the Interlagos circuit) were taken off the calendar after Bernie Ecclestone focused his interest completely on Formula 1 again. The French returned on 1994 in Circuit Bugatti, Le Mans.
 The Austrian, San Marino, Czech Republic (before called the Czechoslovak Grand Prix) and United States Grand Prix returned on the calendar after the shift of interest to Formula 1 by Bernie Ecclestone.
 The Canadian Grand Prix was initially scheduled to be held on 19 September, but was replaced with the United States Grand Prix.
 The FIM Grand Prix was added to the calendar as a one-off Grand Prix to replace the South African Grand Prix.

Participants

500cc participants

250cc participants

125cc participants

Results and standings

Grands Prix

500cc riders' standings
Scoring system
Points are awarded to the top fifteen finishers. A rider has to finish the race to earn points.

250cc riders' standings
Scoring system
Points are awarded to the top fifteen finishers. A rider has to finish the race to earn points.

{|
|

125cc riders' standings
Scoring system
Points are awarded to the top fifteen finishers. A rider has to finish the race to earn points.

{|
|

References
 Büla, Maurice & Schertenleib, Jean-Claude (2001). Continental Circus 1949–2000. Chronosports S.A. 

Grand Prix motorcycle racing seasons